Deone Walker is an American football defensive tackle who currently plays for the Kentucky Wildcats.

Early life and high school
Walker grew up in Detroit, Michigan and attended Cass Technical High School. In addition to playing football, he was also a member of the basketball team. Walker made 28 with 13 tackles for loss, seven sacks and three forced fumbles in his junior season. He had 43 tackles, 15 tackles for loss, and six sacks in seven games as a senior. Walker was rated a four-star recruit and committed to play college football at Kentucky from 30 total scholarship offers, including programs such as Alabama, Georgia, LSU, Michigan, Michigan State, and Penn State.

College career
Walker entered his freshman season at Kentucky as a member of the defensive line rotation before becoming a starter three games into the year. He was named a semifinalist for the Shaun Alexander Award.

References

External links
Kentucky Wildcats bio

Living people
American football defensive tackles
Players of American football from Detroit
Kentucky Wildcats football players
Year of birth missing (living people)